Eduardo Blanco may refer to:

Eduardo Blanco (actor), Spanish/Argentine actor
Eduardo Blanco (footballer) (1897–1958), Argentine footballer
Eduardo Blanco (writer) (1838–1912), Venezuelan history writer and politician